Three alphabets are used to write the Kazakh language: the Cyrillic, Latin and Arabic scripts. The Cyrillic script is used in Kazakhstan and Mongolia. An October 2017 Presidential Decree in Kazakhstan ordered that the transition from Cyrillic to a Latin script be completed by 2025. The Arabic script is used in Arabia, Iran, Afghanistan and parts of China.

Cyrillic script
Kazakh Cyrillic alphabet

The Kazakh Cyrillic alphabet is used in Kazakhstan and the Bayan-Ölgiy Province in Mongolia. It is also used by Kazakh populations in Kyrgyzstan, Russia, Turkmenistan and Uzbekistan, as well as diasporas in other countries of the former USSR. It was introduced during the Russian Empire period in the 1800s, and then adapted by the Soviet Union in 1940.

In the nineteenth century, Ibrahim Altynsarin, a prominent Kazakh educator, first introduced a Cyrillic alphabet for transcribing Kazakh. Russian missionary activity, as well as Russian-sponsored schools, further encouraged the use of Cyrillic in the nineteenth and early twentieth centuries. The alphabet was reworked by Sarsen Amanzholov and accepted in its current form in 1940. It contains 42 letters: 33 from the Russian alphabet with 9 additional letters for sounds of the Kazakh language: Ә, Ғ, Қ, Ң, Ө, Ұ, Ү, Һ, І (until 1951 Ӯ was used instead of Ұ). Initially, Kazakh letters came after letters from the Russian alphabet, but now they are placed after Russian letters similar in sound or shape.

The letters В, Ё (since 1957), Ф, Ц, Ч, Ъ, Ь and Э are not used in native Kazakh words. Of these, Ё, Ц, Ч, Ъ, Ь, Э, are used only in words borrowed from Russian or through the Russian language which are written according to Russian orthographic rules. The letter E in Kazakh makes a sound similar to Э in Russian (ex. Kazakh: Екібастуз - Russian: Экибастуз). The letter Ж is pronounced similarly to ДЖ in Russian (approximately like J in English). The letter Х is pronounced like a wheezing h (hard h). In rapid conversation, the letter Қ (Q) can be pronounced like X (if Қ is in the middle of a word and before a consonant) or like Ғ. The letter Щ is used for the long Ш sound in three native words (ащы 'bitter', тұщы 'saltless', кеще 'stupid') and their derivatives, as well as in loanwords.

The letter И represents the tense vowel  obtained from the combinations ЫЙ  and ІЙ . The letter У represents  and the tense vowel  obtained from the combinations ҰУ , ҮУ , ЫУ  and ІУ . Additionally, И and У are retained in words borrowed from Russian, where they represent the simple vowels  and  respectively.

History 

The switch from a Latin alphabet to a Cyrillic one was likely in an attempt to distance the then-Soviet Kazakhstan from Turkey. This was likely in part due to weakening Turkish–Soviet relations and the Turkish Straits crisis.

In effort to consolidate its national identity, Kazakhstan started a phased transition from the Cyrillic alphabet to the Latin alphabet in 2017. The Kazakh government drafted a seven-year process until the full implementation of the new alphabet, sub-divided into various phases.

Romanization 
Kazakh Cyrillic is romanized for accessibility to readers familiar with the Latin alphabet. Commonly used systems include:

 ALA-LC romanization (American Library Association and Library of Congress), 1940 system, commonly used in English-language bibliographic cataloguing and in academic publishing
 BGN/PCGN romanization (US Board on Geographic Names and Permanent Committee on Geographical Names for British Official Use), 1979 system, commonly used in place names and mapping
 ISO 9:1995 (International Organization for Standardization), 1995, an international system based on central European orthography that uses a single unique character for each letter.

Notes to the BGN/PCGN system

 Character sequences гһ, зһ, кһ, нг, сһ and цһ may be romanized g·h, z·h, k·h, n·g, s·h and ts·h to differentiate from gh, zh, kh, ng, sh, and tsh, which are used to render ғ, ж, х, ң, ш, and тш.
 The character ы may be romanized i̵ instead of у.

Encoding
Before the spread of operating systems and text editors with support for Unicode, Cyrillic Kazakh often failed to fit on a keyboard because of both the problem with 8-bit encoding, which was not supported at the system level, and the absence of standard computer fonts. More than 20 variations of 8-bit encoding for Kazakh Cyrillic have been suggested, including the following government standards (note that the following are historical code pages and that modern systems use Unicode Encoding, such as UTF-8):
 СТ РК 920-91 for MS-DOS (a modification of code page 866)
 СТ РК 1048—2002 for Windows (a modification of code page 1251)
СТ РК 1048—2002 was confirmed in 2002, well after the introduction of different Windows character sets. Some Internet resources in part used the government information agency QazAqparat before the encoding of this standard. Today the encoding UTF-8 is being accepted.

Keyboard
The standard Windows keyboard layout used for Cyrillic Kazakh in Kazakhstan is a modification of the standard Russian keyboard, with characters found in Kazakh but not in Russian located on the number keys.

Latin script

A number of Latin alphabets are in use to write the Kazakh language. A variant based on the Turkish alphabet is unofficially used by the Kazakh diaspora in Turkey and in Western countries and Kazakhstan. As with other Central Asian Turkic languages, a Latin alphabet, the Yañalif, was introduced by the Soviets and used from 1929 to 1940 when it was replaced with Cyrillic. Moreover, a Latin alphabet was used for the Kazakh language for Kazakhs in China during 1964–84. Later, the use of the Kazakh Arabic alphabet was restored in China.

1929 Latin alphabet (Çaꞑalip)

1938 Latin alphabet (Çaꞑalip)

As part of a modernization program, the presidential decree No. 569 signed by Kazakh President Nursultan Nazarbayev ordered the replacement of the Cyrillic script with a Latin script by 2025. In 2007, Nazarbayev said the transformation of the Kazakh alphabet from Cyrillic to Latin should not be rushed, as he noted: "For 70 years, the Kazakhstanis read and wrote in Cyrillic. More than 100 nationalities live in our state. Thus we need stability and peace. We should be in no hurry in the issue of alphabet transformation".

In 2015, the Minister of Culture and Sports Arystanbek Muhamediuly announced that a transition plan was underway, with specialists working on the orthography to accommodate the phonological aspects of the language. On April 12, 2017, President Nazarbayev published an article in state newspaper Egemen Qazaqstan announcing a switchover to the Latin alphabet by 2025, a decision implemented by decree.

Nazarbayev argued that the "Kazakh language and culture have been devastated" during the period of Soviet rule, and that ending the use of Cyrillic is useful in re-asserting national identity. The new Latin alphabet is also a step to weaken the traditional Russian influence on the country, as the Russian language is the country's second official language. The initial proposed Latin alphabet tried to avoid digraphs (such as "sh", "ch") and diacritics (such as "ä" or "ç"). In fact, President Nazarbayev had expressly stated that the new alphabet should contain "no hooks or superfluous dots". Instead, the new alphabet, which is based on a transliteration of Cyrillic into Latin letters, would have used apostrophes to denote those Kazakh letters where there was no direct Latin equivalent. It is similar to the Karakalpak Latin alphabet and the Uzbek alphabet. 

A revised version of the 2017 Latin alphabet was announced in February 2018. Presidential Decree 637 of 19 February 2018 amends the 2017 decree and the use of apostrophes was discontinued and replaced with diacritics and digraphs. Notably, the new alphabet uses the acute accent. A few web applications and sites were launched to facilitate the switch to the Latin-based alphabet. One of them is a new web-based portal, Qazlatyn.kz, that uses the new Latin alphabet to report news and other information about Kazakhstan.

In April 2021, the Latin script for the Kazakh language was presented to the public; it was well received. The current Latin script has similarities especially with Turkish, Azerbaijani and Turkmen alphabets, but also has some elements shared by various romanization systems of Ukrainian. Elementary schools will start using only the new Latin script from 2023. The transition is expected to be completed by 2031.

Latest developments

Kazakh Latin alphabet (April 2021)

In 2020, the President of Kazakhstan Kassym-Jomart Tokayev called for another revision of the Latin alphabet with a focus on preserving the original sounds and pronunciation of the Kazakh language. This revision, presented to the public in November 2019 by academics from the Baitursynov Institute of Linguistics, and specialists belonging to the official working group on script transition, uses umlauts, breves and cedillas instead of digraphs and acute accents, and introduces spelling changes in order to reflect more accurately the phonology of Kazakh. This revision deviated only slightly from the Common Turkic Alphabet (CTA), introducing the letter Ŋ in place of Ñ. As this version was waiting approval, linguists had been in discussion as to which Latin-based letters were to be used in place of the specific Cyrillic-based letters Ә ə, Ғ ғ, И и, Й й, Ң ң, Ө ɵ, У у, Ұ ұ, Ү ү, Ы ы, Ч ч, Ш ш, and І i; a suggested alternative to the introduction of accented characters was to make greater use of digraphs, with ч being written as "tş", for example.

In January 2021, a new revision of the Kazakh Latin alphabet was presented, introducing the letters Ä ä (Ə ə), Ö ö (Ө ө), Ü ü (Ү ү), Ğ ğ (Ғ ғ), Ū ū (Ұ ұ), Ŋ ŋ (Ң ң), and Ş ş (Ш ш), bringing it even closer to the CTA. A subsequent revision on 22 April further narrowed this gap by changing Ŋ ŋ to Ñ ñ. This version will be officially implemented starting 2023.

Arabic script

The Arabic script is the official alphabet for Kazakhs in the Ili Kazakh Autonomous Prefecture of the Xinjiang Uyghur Autonomous Region of China. It was first introduced to the territory of Kazakhstan in the eleventh century and was traditionally used to write Kazakh until the introduction of a Latin alphabet in 1929. In 1924, Kazakh intellectual Akhmet Baitursynov attempted to reform the Arabic script to better suit Kazakh.

A modified Arabic script is also used in Iran and Afghanistan, based on the alphabet used for Kazakh before 1929.

The Kazakh Arabic alphabet contains 29 letters and one digit, the 'upper hamza' used at the beginnings of words to create front vowels throughout the word. The direction the alphabet is written in is right to left. Unlike the original Arabic script, which is an abjad, the Kazakh Arabic script functions more like a true alphabet, as each sound has its own letter and every sound in each word is spelt out in the written form of the language. The reform of the Arabic script from an abjad to an alphabet was carried out by the early 20th-century linguist Akhmet Baitursynov.

Kazakhs living now in China, Pakistan, Afghanistan, Iran and other countries of the Middle East use the Arabic script.

Forms of the Kazakh Arabic alphabet

Correspondence chart
Here is the correspondence chart of the official writing scripts:

Symbols in parentheses are for bi-directional transliteration only. See Menıñ Qazaqstanym.

Historical alphabets

Old Turkic alphabet 

Orkhon-Yenisey letters have a superficial similarity to Germanic runes in shape, and so are sometimes called runes. Unlike the Germanic runes, the Old Turkic script was written right to left while Germanic runes were usually written left to right. The script was used in some parts of Kazakhstan's territory in the fifth to the tenth centuries. The language of the inscriptions was the Old Turkic, the language of the First Turkic Khaganate.

Kipchak Armenian 
Migrating from the Armenian kingdom in the late twelfth and thirteenth centuries, the Armenians had an extensive liturgical, legal and other literature in the Kipchak language that differs from Old Kazakh only by the abundance of the Armenian-Christian vocabulary. These texts were written using the Armenian alphabet. Their descendants who settled around the world, almost to the end of the nineteenth century, the Armenian-Kipchak were writing business records, personal correspondence and more.

Latin Kipchak 
Catholic missionaries in Crimea produced holy books in the Kipchak language, the ancestor of the Kazakh language, they produced the Gospel and the other liturgical books.

Other writing systems 

There are epigraphic monuments of Turkic tribes (mainly to the period of Islamization).

For sight-impaired people, there is also Kazakh Braille, based on Russian Braille, with several additional letters found in the Kazakh alphabet.

Text sample
Article 1 of the Universal Declaration of Human Rights:

References

External links
 Kazakh alphabet (in Russian)
 Kazakh language, alphabet and pronunciation
 Kazakh Cyrillic–Arabic–Latin converter
 ALASH Cyrillic–Latin–Arabic–Runic online converter
 Cyrillic–Latin 2018 online converter
 Official Kazakh version (in Arabic script) of the People's Daily Online

Arabic alphabets
Cyrillic alphabets
Latin alphabets
Alphabets
Alphabets used by Turkic languages